The sandy grizzled skipper (Pyrgus cinarae) is a species of skipper (family Hesperiidae). It has a restricted range in southeastern Europe with a small relict population in central Spain.

As with many Pyrgus species, this can be difficult to identify in the field. It is quite large for the genus (wingspan 30–32 mm) and the underside of the hindwings are usually paler olive-brown than most of its congeners with large white markings but identification generally requires scrutiny in the hand. The adults are usually seen flying in June but very little else is known about the ecology of this species and the larval food plant is unknown.

References

Whalley, Paul - Mitchell Beazley Guide to Butterflies (1981, reprinted 1992)

External links
Captain's European Butterfly guide
Lepiforum.de
Butterfly Conservation Armenia

Pyrgus
Butterflies described in 1839
Butterflies of Europe